Vortex is a 2009 Lithuanian drama film, directed by Gytis Lukšas, a known Lithuanian film director. It is an adaptation of the novel Duburys by Lithuanian writer Romualdas Granauskas. Granauskas is a winner of Lithuanian National Prize. One review called the film "rather boring".

References

2009 films
Lithuanian drama films
Films based on Lithuanian novels